The Invisible Man Attacks (Spanish:El Hombre invisible ataca) is a 1967 Argentine comedy film.

Cast
 Martin Karadagián
 Gilda Lousek
 Tristan
 Ricardo Passano
 Joe rigoli
 Guillermo Battaglia
 Nathan Pinzón
 Gobbi dart
 Mila Demarie
 The Gypsy Ivanoff
 Oscar Orlegui
 Susana Mayo

External links
 

1967 films
Argentine comedy films
1960s Spanish-language films
1960s Argentine films